Trichostomum is a genus of mosses belonging to the family Pottiaceae.

The genus has a cosmopolitan distribution.

Species
The following species are recognised in the genus Trichostomum:
 
Trichostomum abyssinicum 
Trichostomum acutiusculum 
Trichostomum aeneum 
Trichostomum aequatoriale 
Trichostomum afrum 
Trichostomum aggregatum 
Trichostomum alpinum 
Trichostomum amblyophyllum 
Trichostomum anoectangioides 
Trichostomum anomodon 
Trichostomum apiculatum 
Trichostomum apophysatulum 
Trichostomum arboreum 
Trichostomum arcticum 
Trichostomum ardjunense 
Trichostomum aristatulum 
Trichostomum atrocaule 
Trichostomum atrovirens 
Trichostomum austroalpigena 
Trichostomum austrocrispum 
Trichostomum bellii 
Trichostomum bermudanum 
Trichostomum bescherellei 
Trichostomum bifidum 
Trichostomum borneense 
Trichostomum brachydontium 
Trichostomum brevisetum 
Trichostomum brittonianum 
Trichostomum brunneum 
Trichostomum calymperaceum 
Trichostomum calyptratum 
Trichostomum cameruniae 
Trichostomum campylocarpum 
Trichostomum campylopyxis 
Trichostomum canaliculatum 
Trichostomum cardotii 
Trichostomum carinatum 
Trichostomum castaneum 
Trichostomum cavernarum 
Trichostomum challaense 
Trichostomum circinatum 
Trichostomum circinnatulum 
Trichostomum clavinerve 
Trichostomum cockaynii 
Trichostomum compactulum 
Trichostomum compactulum 
Trichostomum connivens 
Trichostomum contortifolium 
Trichostomum contortum 
Trichostomum contractum 
Trichostomum corniculatum 
Trichostomum criotum 
Trichostomum crispulum 
Trichostomum crustaceum 
Trichostomum curtum 
Trichostomum cuspidatum 
Trichostomum deciduaefolium 
Trichostomum decurvifolium 
Trichostomum diminutum 
Trichostomum distans 
Trichostomum duidense 
Trichostomum eckelianum 
Trichostomum edentulum 
Trichostomum elliottii 
Trichostomum episemum 
Trichostomum esquirolii 
Trichostomum etessei 
Trichostomum excurrens 
Trichostomum exulatum 
Trichostomum fallaciosum 
Trichostomum fallax 
Trichostomum fendleri 
Trichostomum finukamactum 
Trichostomum flavisetum 
Trichostomum fontanum 
Trichostomum fragilifolium 
Trichostomum glauco-viride 
Trichostomum glaucoviride 
Trichostomum gracilescens 
Trichostomum gracillimum 
Trichostomum gracillimum 
Trichostomum grimmioides 
Trichostomum grossirete 
Trichostomum gymnum 
Trichostomum hattorianum 
Trichostomum hibernicum 
Trichostomum hondurense 
Trichostomum humile 
Trichostomum hyalinoblastum 
Trichostomum imperfectum 
Trichostomum imshaugii 
Trichostomum incertum 
Trichostomum inclinatum 
Trichostomum insulare 
Trichostomum interruptum 
Trichostomum involutum 
Trichostomum jamesonii 
Trichostomum julaceum 
Trichostomum kanieriense 
Trichostomum knightii 
Trichostomum knightii 
Trichostomum laetum 
Trichostomum lambii 
Trichostomum lamprothecium 
Trichostomum laticostatum 
Trichostomum leptocylindricum 
Trichostomum leptocylindricum 
Trichostomum leptodum 
Trichostomum leptotheca 
Trichostomum leptotheca 
Trichostomum lignicola 
Trichostomum ligulaefolium 
Trichostomum lillei 
Trichostomum lindigii 
Trichostomum lineare 
Trichostomum linoides 
Trichostomum lorifolium 
Trichostomum majus 
Trichostomum mandonii 
Trichostomum marginatum 
Trichostomum mauiense 
Trichostomum melanostomum 
Trichostomum mexicanum 
Trichostomum microthecium 
Trichostomum mildeanum 
Trichostomum minutifolium 
Trichostomum minutissimum 
Trichostomum mitteneanum 
Trichostomum mosis 
Trichostomum mucronatulum 
Trichostomum mucronatum 
Trichostomum muticum 
Trichostomum nervosum 
Trichostomum nodiflorum 
Trichostomum nordenskioeldii 
Trichostomum occidentale 
Trichostomum orthodontum 
Trichostomum ovatifolium 
Trichostomum pallidens 
Trichostomum paludicola 
Trichostomum papillosum 
Trichostomum pennequinii 
Trichostomum perangustum 
Trichostomum perichaetiale 
Trichostomum perinvolutum 
Trichostomum perligulatum 
Trichostomum perplexum 
Trichostomum perpusillum 
Trichostomum perrieri 
Trichostomum persicum 
Trichostomum perviride 
Trichostomum philippinense 
Trichostomum piliferum 
Trichostomum planifolium 
Trichostomum platyphyllum 
Trichostomum platyphyllum 
Trichostomum plicatulum 
Trichostomum plicatulum 
Trichostomum pomangium 
Trichostomum portoricense 
Trichostomum prionodon 
Trichostomum prionodon 
Trichostomum protensum 
Trichostomum pulicare 
Trichostomum pygmaeum 
Trichostomum pyriforme 
Trichostomum ramulosum 
Trichostomum recurvifolium 
Trichostomum rehmannii 
Trichostomum repens 
Trichostomum rhodesiae 
Trichostomum riparium 
Trichostomum rivale 
Trichostomum robustum 
Trichostomum rubripes 
Trichostomum ruvenzorense 
Trichostomum saxicola 
Trichostomum schimperi 
Trichostomum searellii 
Trichostomum semivaginatum 
Trichostomum setifolium 
Trichostomum sinaloense 
Trichostomum sinochenii 
Trichostomum soulae 
Trichostomum sparsifolium 
Trichostomum spathulato-lineare 
Trichostomum spirale 
Trichostomum sporaphyllum 
Trichostomum squarrosum 
Trichostomum stanilandsii 
Trichostomum stellatum 
Trichostomum striatum 
Trichostomum strictum 
Trichostomum subangustifolium 
Trichostomum subcirrhatum 
Trichostomum subconnivens 
Trichostomum subintegrum 
Trichostomum subinvolvens 
Trichostomum sublamprothecium 
Trichostomum subsecundum 
Trichostomum sumatranum 
Trichostomum sweetii 
Trichostomum syntrichioides 
Trichostomum tenuirostre 
Trichostomum termitarum 
Trichostomum tisserantii 
Trichostomum tortella 
Trichostomum tortelloides 
Trichostomum tortuloides 
Trichostomum tovarense 
Trichostomum trachyneuron 
Trichostomum triumphans 
Trichostomum tucumanense 
Trichostomum umbrosum 
Trichostomum unguiculatum 
Trichostomum urceolare 
Trichostomum usambaricum 
Trichostomum vancouveriense 
Trichostomum villaumei 
Trichostomum wagneri 
Trichostomum wayanadense 
Trichostomum weisioides 
Trichostomum whittonii 
Trichostomum wildii 
Trichostomum williamsii 
Trichostomum winteri 
Trichostomum woodii 
Trichostomum zanderi

References

Pottiaceae
Moss genera